In Tibetan cuisine, Gong'a Momo is a fried dough made with eggs and flour and stuffed with meat paste.

See also
 List of Tibetan dishes

References

Tibetan cuisine
Dumplings
Stuffed dishes
Meat dishes
Deep fried foods